Ultra Mix was a dance compilation series from 1997 by Universal's Priority Records. It is unrelated to the Ultra.Mix compilation series of the 2010s. The series was an attempt by Universal Music to broaden Priority Record's appeal away from rap music.

Discography
Ultra Mix - The Best Of Tribal America, DJ Tony Largo
Ultra Mix - Euro-Dance, Rafael M.
Ultra Mix - Drum'N'Bass, DJ Raw  
Ultra Mix - Euro-Dance Hi-NRG, mixed by Manny Lehman (disc jockey)
Ultra-Mix 98, produced, mixed and mastered by Chris Cox (DJ)

References

1997 compilation albums
Compilation album series